The 376th Air Refueling Squadron is an inactive United States Air Force unit. It was last assigned to the 4081st Strategic Wing at Ernest Harmon Air Force Base, Newfoundland, where it was inactivated in June 1966.

History

World War II

Established in early 1943 as the 376th Fighter Squadron and equipped with  Republic P-47 Thunderbolts, the squadron trained under I Fighter Command in the mid-Atlantic states. Also flew air defense missions as part of the Philadelphia Fighter Wing. Deployed to the European Theater of Operations, being assigned to VIII Fighter Command in England, November 1943.

The unit served primarily as an escort organization, covering the penetration, attack, and withdrawal of Boeing B-17 flying Fortress and Consolidated B-24 Liberator bomber formations that the United States Air Forces in Europe sent against targets on the Continent. The squadron also engaged in counter-air patrols, fighter sweeps, and strafing and dive-bombing missions. Attacked such targets as airdromes, marshalling yards, missile sites, industrial areas, ordnance depots, oil refineries, trains, and highways. During its operations, the unit participated in the assault against the Luftwaffe and aircraft industry during Big Week, 20–25 February 1944, and the attack on transportation facilities prior to the Normandy invasion and support of the invasion forces thereafter, including the Saint-Lô breakthrough in July.

The squadron supported the airborne attack on the Netherlands in September 1944 and deployed to Chievres Airdrome, (ALG A-84), Belgium between February and April 1945 flying tactical ground support missions during the airborne assault across the Rhine. The unit returned to RAF Little Walden and flew its last combat mission on 20 April 1945.  Demobilized during the summer of 1945 in England, inactivated in the United States as a paper unit in October.

Cold War
The squadron flew the Boeing KC-97 Stratofreighter, first, the KC-97F, then the KC-97G. stationed at Barksdale Air Force Base, providing air refueling to USAF units from 1953 to 1960.  In August 1960, the squadron moved to Ernest Harmon Air Force Base, Newfoundland

Expeditionary unit
The 376th Fighter Squadron and 376th Air Refueling Squadron were consolidated into a single unit in September 1985.  The consolidated squadron was converted to provisional status and redesignated the 376th Expeditionary Air Refueling Squadron in June 2002.

Lineage

 376th Fighter Squadron
 Constituted as the 376th Fighter Squadron, Single Engine on 28 January 1943
 Activated on 10 February 1943
 Inactivated on 10 November 1945
 Consolidated on 19 September 1985 with the 376th Air Refueling Squadron as the 376th Air Refueling Squadron

 376th Expeditionary Air Refueling Squadron
 Constituted as the 376th Air Refueling Squadron, Medium
 Activated on 1 June 1951
 Inactivated on 20 May 1952
 Activated on 18 August 1953
 Inactivated on 25 June 1966
 Consolidated on 19 September 1985 with the 376th Fighter Squadron as the 376th Air Refueling Squadron, Heavy
 Redesignated 376th Expeditionary Air Refueling Squadron and converted to provisional status on 12 June 2002

Assignments
 361st Fighter Group, 10 February 1943 – 10 November 1945
 376th Bombardment Group: 1 June 1951 – 20 May 1952 (Not manned or equipped)
 376th Bombardment Wing: 18 August 1953
 4th Air Division: 1 December 1957 (attached to 301st Bombardment Wing)
 4238th Strategic Wing: 1 March 1958 (remained attached to 301st Bombardment Wing until 15 April 1958)
 4081st Strategic Wing: 1 July 1960 – 25 June 1966
 Air Mobility Command to activate or inactivate as needed, 12 June 2002
 Air Combat Command to activate or inactivate as needed, 19 March 2003

Stations

 Richmond Army Air Base, Virginia, 10 February 1943
 Camp Springs Army Air Field, Maryland, 26 May 1943
 Millville Army Air Field, New Jersey, 15 August 1943
 Camp Springs Army Air Field, Maryland, 18 September 1943
 Richmond Army Air Base, Virginia, 30 September – 11 November 1943
 RAF Bottisham (AAF-374), England, 30 November 1943
 RAF Little Walden (AAF-165), England, ca. 28 September 1944 (Operated from St-Dizier Airfield (A-64), France, after 23 December 1944)

 Chievres Airfield (A-84), Belgium, 1 February 1945
 RAF Little Walden (AAF-165), England, 7 April – c. 11 October 1945
 Camp Kilmer, New Jersey, 23–24 October 1945
 Barksdale Air Force Base, Louisiana 1 June 1951 – 20 May 1952
 Barksdale Air Force Base, Louisiana, 18 August 1953
 Ernest Harmon Air Force Base, Newfoundland, Canada, 15 August 1960 – 25 June 1966

Aircraft
 Republic P-47 Thunderbolt, 1943–1944
 North American P-51D Mustang, 1944–1945
 Boeing KC-97 Stratotanker 1953–1966

References

Notes
 Explanatory notes

 Citations

Bibliography

 
 
 
 
 
 
 

Air refueling squadrons of the United States Air Force